1,3-Cyclopentanedione is an organic compound with the formula (CH2)3(CO)2.  It is one of two isomeric cyclopentanediones, the other being 1,2-cyclopentanedione.  The enol is predicted to be about 1-3 kcal/mol more stable than the diketo form.  The enol structure has been confirmed by X-ray crystallography.

Preparation
The compound is prepared by hydrogenation of 2-cyclopentene-1,4-dione using zinc/acetic acid.

References

Diketones
Cyclic ketones